Black Widow is a 2021 American superhero film based on Marvel Comics featuring the character of the same name. Produced by Marvel Studios and distributed by Walt Disney Studios Motion Pictures, it is the 24th film in the Marvel Cinematic Universe (MCU). The film was directed by Cate Shortland from a screenplay by Eric Pearson, and stars Scarlett Johansson as Natasha Romanoff / Black Widow alongside Florence Pugh, David Harbour, O-T Fagbenle, Olga Kurylenko, William Hurt, Ray Winstone, and Rachel Weisz. Set after the events of Captain America: Civil War (2016), the film sees Romanoff on the run and forced to confront her past as a Russian spy before she became an Avenger.

Lionsgate Films began developing a Black Widow film in April 2004, with David Hayter attached to write and direct. The project did not move forward and the character's film rights had reverted to Marvel Studios by June 2006. Johansson was cast in the role for several MCU films beginning with Iron Man 2 (2010), and began discussing a solo film with Marvel. Work began in late 2017, with Shortland hired in 2018. Jac Schaeffer and Ned Benson contributed to the script before Pearson was hired. Filming took place from May to October 2019 in Norway, Budapest, Morocco, Pinewood Studios in England, and in Atlanta, Macon, and Rome, Georgia.

Black Widow premiered at events around the world on June 29, 2021, and was released in the United States on July 9, simultaneously in theaters and through Disney+ with Premier Access. It is the first film in Phase Four of the MCU, and was delayed three times from an original May 2020 release date due to the COVID-19 pandemic. Black Widow broke several pandemic box office records and grossed over $379 million worldwide. The film received positive reviews from critics, with praise for the performances, particularly those of Johansson and Pugh, and the action sequences. In July 2021, Johansson filed a lawsuit against Disney over the simultaneous release, which was settled two months later.

Plot 

In 1995, super soldier Alexei Shostakov and Black Widow Melina Vostokoff work as Russian undercover agents, posing as a family in Ohio with Natasha Romanoff and Yelena Belova as their daughters. They steal S.H.I.E.L.D. intel and escape to Cuba where their boss, General Dreykov, has Romanoff and Belova taken to the Red Room for training. In the following decades, Shostakov is imprisoned in Russia while Romanoff and Belova become successful, dangerous assassins. Romanoff eventually defects to S.H.I.E.L.D. after helping Clint Barton bomb Dreykov's Budapest office, which apparently kills Dreykov and his young daughter Antonia.

In 2016, Romanoff is a fugitive for violating the Sokovia Accords. She escapes from U.S. Secretary of State Thaddeus Ross and flees to a safehouse in Norway supplied by Rick Mason. Meanwhile, Belova kills a rogue former Black Widow but comes in contact with a synthetic gas that neutralizes the Red Room's chemical mind-control agent. Belova sends antidote vials to Romanoff, hoping she and the Avengers can free the other Widows, and goes into hiding. When Romanoff is unknowingly driving with the vials in her car, Red Room agent Taskmaster attacks her. Romanoff escapes from Taskmaster and realizes that the vials came from Budapest. There she finds Belova, who reveals that Dreykov is alive and the Red Room is still active. Black Widows and Taskmaster attack them, but Romanoff and Belova evade them and meet with Mason, who supplies them with a helicopter.

Romanoff and Belova break Shostakov out of prison to learn Dreykov's location, and he directs them to Vostokoff, who lives on a farm outside Saint Petersburg. There she is refining the chemical mind control process used on the Widows. Vostokoff alerts Dreykov and his agents arrive to take them, but Romanoff convinces Vostokoff to help them and the pair use face mask technology to switch places. At the Red Room, an aerial facility, Vostokoff frees Shostakov and Belova from their restraints. Dreykov sees through Romanoff's disguise and reveals that Taskmaster is Antonia, who suffered damage severe enough that Dreykov had to put technology in her head to save her, in turn creating the perfect soldier, capable of mimicking the actions of anyone she sees. Romanoff is unable to attack Dreykov due to a pheromone lock installed in every Widow, but negates that by breaking her own nose and severing her olfactory nerve. Shostakov battles Taskmaster while Vostokoff takes out one of the facility's engines. They then lock Taskmaster in a cell.

Dreykov escapes as other Black Widows attack Romanoff, but Belova exposes them to the antidote. Romanoff copies the locations of other Widows worldwide from Dreykov's computer as the facility begins to explode and fall. She retrieves two surviving antidote vials and frees Taskmaster from the locked cell. Vostokoff and Shostakov escape via a plane while Belova takes out Dreykov's aircraft, killing him. In freefall, Romanoff gives Belova a parachute before battling Taskmaster. After landing, Romanoff uses one antidote vial on Taskmaster and gives the other to Belova along with the locations of the other mind-controlled Widows so she can find and free them. Belova, Vostokoff, and Shostakov say goodbye to Romanoff and leave with Antonia and the freed Widows. Two weeks later, Mason supplies Romanoff with a Quinjet to use in freeing the imprisoned Avengers.

In a post-credits scene set after Romanoff's death, Valentina Allegra de Fontaine blames her death on Barton and assigns him as Belova's next target.

Cast 

 Scarlett Johansson as Natasha Romanoff / Black Widow:An Avenger, highly trained former-KGB assassin and former agent of S.H.I.E.L.D. Johansson said she was "going out on a high note" and was proud of the film, feeling that her work portraying Romanoff was now complete. She described the film as an opportunity to show the character as "a woman who has come into her own and is making independent and active choices for herself", while being in a dark place with no one to call, and felt the character's vulnerability set her apart from the other Avengers. Director Cate Shortland watched all of Romanoff's MCU appearances consecutively in preparation for the film, and chose to set the story where Romanoff is alone and not "in relation to anyone else". Shortland said Romanoff's ambiguous psychological journey was the center of the story. Ever Anderson portrays a young Natasha Romanoff. Anderson, who speaks Russian, felt her background in taekwondo and gymnastics training was helpful for the role.
 Florence Pugh as Yelena Belova:A sister to Romanoff who was trained in the Red Room as a Black Widow. Johansson said Belova was an early inclusion in the film who could stand on her own in comparison to Romanoff. Pugh said there was a "generational difference" between the two, and described Belova as "unapologetic, and confident in herself, and curious... and emotionally brave". Pugh admired Belova's bluntness and determination, and noted that the character is a skilled fighter but does not know how to live a normal life. Shortland said that Romanoff would be "handing [Belova] the baton" in the film, and Pugh looked to Johansson for guidance during filming on meeting the demands of making Marvel films. Johansson wanted to avoid an antagonistic dynamic between the two characters, instead having a sister-like but contentious relationship that Pugh characterized as "a sister story that really hones in on grief, on pain, on abuse, on being a victim—and living with being a victim". Violet McGraw portrays a young Yelena Belova.
 David Harbour as Alexei Shostakov / Red Guardian:The Russian super-soldier counterpart to Captain America and a father-figure to Romanoff and Belova. Harbour said Shostakov was not heroic or noble, and was both comically and tragically flawed. Shostakov claims that he fought Captain America in the 1980s, and screenwriter Eric Pearson felt the character believed that this was true despite it being impossible. For Harbour's portrayal, he and Shortland discussed Ricky Gervais' performance in The Office and Philip Seymour Hoffman's in The Savages (2007), "comedy that comes out of real domestic need". Harbour had already grown his facial hair for the fourth season of Stranger Things, and he gained weight for the role to be . He then lost  over the course of filming to portray a younger version of the character for the film's opening flashback sequence. 
 O-T Fagbenle as Rick Mason:An ally from Romanoff's S.H.I.E.L.D. past who is romantically interested in her. Fagbenle described Mason as a "finder for people who aren't so affiliated with armies" who assists Romanoff in that manner. On why a romance between Mason and Romanoff is not explored in the film, Fagbenle said the film was "bigger than that" and their relationship was part of Romanoff's larger family instead. Aside from Pearson's script, Fagbenle developed Mason's backstory with Shortland and Johansson. As Taskmaster's identity was kept secret, many people assumed Mason would secretly take up the mantle, which Fagbenle had to deny even to his personal trainer. The film's final scene, in which Mason provides Romanoff with a Quinjet, was added as part of reshoots in early 2020 after test audiences liked seeing Romanoff and Mason together.
 Olga Kurylenko as Antonia Dreykov / Taskmaster:Dreykov's daughter who completes missions for the Red Room. She has photographic reflexes that allow her to mimic opponents' fighting styles, and uses techniques from superheroes such as Iron Man, Captain America, the Winter Soldier, Spider-Man, and Black Panther. Several body doubles were required to portray the character's various skills. Kurylenko said much of Antonia's pain is internal, and described her relationship with Dreykov as abusive since Dreykov uses her "as a tool [and] has her do whatever he wants". Taskmaster is revealed to be Antonia in the film instead of the comic book counterpart Tony Masters since Masters is a mercenary that did not fit into the film's story and it was more natural to Pearson to tie Taskmaster into a "loose end from Natasha's past". Ryan Kiera Armstrong portrays a young Antonia Dreykov.
 William Hurt as Thaddeus Ross: The United States Secretary of State and a former U.S. Army general.
 Ray Winstone as Dreykov:A Russian general and the head of the Red Room. Pearson felt the film needed a villain that could fit within its timeframe undetected so as to avoid contradicting the events of Avengers: Infinity War (2018). He described Dreykov as a coward who is "puppeteering things" from the shadows and does not care about hurting others.
 Rachel Weisz as Melina Vostokoff:A seasoned spy trained in the Red Room as a Black Widow and a mother-figure to Romanoff and Belova who is now one of the Red Room's lead scientists. Compared to Vostokoff's comic book counterpart, who becomes the supervillain Iron Maiden, Weisz felt the film's version was more ambiguous and layered, with a deadpan personality and no sense of humor which Weisz found amusing. Weisz was given a tailored Black Widow suit for the film which she called an "iconic" piece of clothing that was "a lot to live up to". Weisz reworked Vostokoff's portrayal to be more affectionate towards Shostakov, rather than dismissive.

Additionally, Liani Samuel, Michelle Lee, and Nanna Blondell appear as Red Room assassins Lerato, Oksana, and Ingrid, respectively, while Jade Xu portrays another Black Widow, later identified as Helen in Shang-Chi and the Legend of the Ten Rings (2021). Olivier Richters portrays Ursa Major, a fellow inmate of Shostakov's. The film's post-credits scene sees Julia Louis-Dreyfus reprising her role as Valentina Allegra de Fontaine from the Disney+ series The Falcon and the Winter Soldier (2021) in an uncredited cameo appearance. Jeremy Renner reprises his MCU role as Clint Barton in an uncredited voice-only cameo.

Production

Development 

In February 2004, Lionsgate acquired the film rights for Black Widow, and in April announced David Hayter as writer and director of the film, with Marvel Studios' Avi Arad producing. By June 2006, Lionsgate had dropped the project and the rights reverted to Marvel Studios. Hayter and Marvel tried getting another financier to develop the project, but Hayter "never felt comfortable that we had found a place that was willing to take the movie, and the character, seriously". This left Hayter "heartbroken", but he hoped the film would be made "some day".

Marvel entered early talks with Emily Blunt to play Black Widow in Iron Man 2 (2010) in January 2009, but she was unable to take the role due to a previous commitment to star in Gulliver's Travels (2010). In March 2009, Scarlett Johansson signed on to play Natasha Romanoff / Black Widow, with her deal including options for multiple films. In September 2010, while promoting the home media release of Iron Man 2, Marvel Studios President Kevin Feige stated that discussions with Johansson had already taken place regarding a Black Widow standalone film, but that Marvel's focus was on The Avengers (2012). Johansson reprised her role in that film, as well as in Captain America: The Winter Soldier (2014), Avengers: Age of Ultron (2015), Captain America: Civil War (2016), Avengers: Infinity War (2018), and Avengers: Endgame (2019). After the release of Age of Ultron, Johansson revealed that the number of films on her contract had been adjusted since she first signed to match the "demand of the character", as Marvel had not anticipated the audience's "great reaction" to the character and her performance.

In February 2014, Feige said that after exploring Black Widow's past in Age of Ultron, he would like to see it explored further in a solo film, which already had development work done for it, including a "pretty in depth" treatment by Nicole Perlman, who co-wrote Marvel's Guardians of the Galaxy (2014). The following April, Johansson expressed interest in starring in a Black Widow film, and said that it would be driven by demand from the audience. That July, Hayter expressed interest in reviving the project for Marvel, and the following month, director Neil Marshall said that he "would  to do a Black Widow film", saying he felt the character was "really interesting [given] she doesn't have any superpowers, she just has extraordinary skills, and the world that she comes from, being this ex-K.G.B. assassin, I find that really fascinating". In April 2015, Johansson spoke more on the possibility of a solo Black Widow film, seeing the potential to explore the character's different layers as depicted in her previous appearances. However, she felt that the character was being "used well in this part of the universe" at that time. While promoting Civil War the next April, Feige noted that due to the announced schedule of films, any potential Black Widow film would be four or five years away. He added that Marvel was "creatively and emotionally" committed to making a Black Widow film eventually.

Joss Whedon, the director of The Avengers and Avengers: Age of Ultron, said in July 2016 that he was open to directing a Black Widow film, feeling he could make "a spy thriller. Like really do a good, paranoid, 'John le Carré on crack' sort of thing." In October, Johansson discussed the potential film being a prequel, saying, "you can bring it back to Russia. You could explore the Widow program. There's all kinds of stuff that you could do with it." She did caution she may not want to "wear a skin-tight catsuit" for much longer. The next February, Johansson said that she would dedicate herself to making any potential Black Widow film "amazing. It would have to be the best version that movie could possibly be. Otherwise, I would never do it ... [it would] have to be its own standalone and its own style and its own story." Due to the development work already done, and the public support for a Black Widow film, Marvel ultimately decided that the best time to move forward with the project would be at the beginning of the "latest phase" of the MCU in 2020.

Feige met with Johansson to discuss the direction of a solo film in October 2017, before Marvel began meeting with writers for the project, including Jac Schaeffer and Jessica Gao. Gao's pitch for the film was influenced by Grosse Pointe Blank (1997), in which Romanoff would have been planted in a high school to assassinate a target and then attends a high school reunion 20 years later "and has to deal with the fallout of this fake identity where she betrayed all these people in high school". It also heavily featured She-Hulk, with Marvel Studios executive Brad Winderbaum feeling Gao was instead pitching a She-Hulk film that featured Black Widow, rather than focusing on Black Widow. Gao would later become the head writer for the TV series She-Hulk: Attorney at Law (2022). Following the #MeToo movement, Johansson wanted the film to comment on the movement which saw women supporting each other and "coming through these shared experiences of trauma on the other side". Schaeffer met with Feige in December, and was hired to write the screenplay by the end of 2017. Schaeffer and Johansson were set to discuss the direction of the film at the beginning of February 2018.

Marvel began meeting with female directors to potentially take on the project, part of a priority push by major film studios to hire female directors for franchises. By the end of April, the studio had met with over 65 directors for the project in an "extremely thorough" search, including Deniz Gamze Ergüven, Chloé Zhao—who went on to direct Marvel's Eternals (2021)—Amma Asante, and Lynn Shelton. Lucrecia Martel was also approached, but was discouraged when told she would not have to "worry about the action scenes". She also felt the music and visual effects of Marvel films were "horrible". In the following months, a shortlist of 49 directors was made before the top choices of Cate Shortland, Asante, and Maggie Betts met with Feige and Johansson in June. Mélanie Laurent and Kimberly Peirce were also in the "next-to-final mix". Johansson was a fan of Shortland's previous female-starring film Lore (2012), and was the one who approached her about directing the film; Shortland was hired in July. Johansson said Black Widow became "more of a reality" during the filming of Infinity War and she was also aware of the character's death in Endgame. Knowing this helped inform when Black Widow would take place in the MCU timeline. Johansson also believed there was "no pressing urgency" to make the film, and that making it when it was, rather than years earlier, allowed the film to be "about real stuff".

The Hollywood Reporter reported in October 2018 that Johansson would earn $15 million for the film, an increase from the "low-seven figure salary" that she earned for starring in The Avengers. Chris Evans and Chris Hemsworth each earned $15 million for the third films in their MCU franchises—Civil War and Thor: Ragnarok (2017), respectively, and also earned the same amount for co-starring in Infinity War and Endgame. Despite The Hollywood Reporter claiming the salaries were confirmed by "multiple knowledgeable sources" for their report, Marvel Studios disputed the accuracy of the numbers, saying that they "never publicly disclose salaries or deal terms." The Walt Disney Company later stated that Johansson earned $20 million by the end of July 2021 for her work on the film. Johansson also served as an executive producer on the film.

Pre-production 
In February 2019, Ned Benson was hired to rewrite the script, and Feige confirmed that, despite rumors, the studio did not want the film to receive an R-rating from the Motion Picture Association. The following month, Florence Pugh entered negotiations to join the cast as a spy who is "morally opposite" to Romanoff, later revealed to be Yelena Belova. Marvel had been considering Pugh for the role since late 2018, but began looking at other actresses, including Saoirse Ronan, in early 2019. The studio returned to Pugh after she received strong reviews for her performance in the film Fighting with My Family (2019). Devin Grayson and J. G. Jones, who co-created Belova, had expected to receive $25,000 for her appearance in the film due to a 2007 agreement with Marvel Comics, but ultimately received $5,000 due to a provision in the contract which allowed Marvel to reduce creators' payments; after Grayson went public with her claims, Marvel agreed to pay her the remaining amount. In April 2019, Pugh was confirmed to have been cast alongside David Harbour, Rachel Weisz, and O-T Fagbenle. Shortland said the film would not be an origin story despite being a prequel to Infinity War and Endgame, as Feige felt that would be expected of a prequel and decided to move in the "opposite direction" of that idea. Feige likened the film to the television series Better Call Saul, which is a prequel to the series Breaking Bad, because it was "a wonderful example of a prequel that almost completely stands on its own... [but] it informs you about so many things you didn't know about before". Shortland acknowledged Romanoff's death in Endgame and the fact that some fans were upset she did not receive a funeral in that film, but said the character was private and did not know many people so she would not have wanted a funeral. However, Black Widow allowed the ending "to be the grief the individuals felt, rather than a big public outpouring".

Eric Pearson is credited as the screenwriter for Black Widow, with Schaeffer and Benson receiving story credit. The film is mostly set between the main plot of Captain America: Civil War and that film's final scene, in which the Avengers escape from prison. Johansson and Feige felt setting the film after Civil War was "the best place to start" because it is the first time that Romanoff is on her own and not tied to a larger organization. A version of the script from before Pearson joined had included a scene from Civil War between Romanoff and Robert Downey Jr.'s Tony Stark / Iron Man, and Downey was reported to be appearing in the film, but Shortland and Feige decided against adding Stark or any other heroes to the film in order for Romanoff to stand on her own, and it was determined that the scene did not add anything new. The story sees Romanoff confronting Dreykov, the head of the Red Room, with Johansson explaining that she is running away from that trauma of her past, only for her sister, Belova, to force her to "come to terms with that" and face it in the film. Johansson added that these ideas were relevant to real-world events in the time the film was being made, and she was grateful to have the film to comment on these. The film begins with an opening credits sequence designed by Perception, featuring flashbacks to the Red Room and pictures of Dreykov, with Feige explaining that Shortland wanted to tell the story of what Dreykov is responsible for at the beginning of the film. A scene at the end of the film in which Thaddeus Ross pursues Romanoff was deliberately left unresolved, as Shortland wanted to leave the audience "on a high" questioning how Romanoff escapes rather than exhaust them with another fight.

Filming 
Principal photography began on May 28, 2019, in Norway. Shortland wanted the film to have "peril at its heart" and be "really emotional but also story-driven". She took inspiration from films like How to Train Your Dragon (2010), No Country for Old Men (2007), and Thelma & Louise (1991), as well as Captain America: The Winter Soldier. Shortland also looked at combat films and ones with armies and militia, allowing her to image females in those roles to help translate that to Black Widow. She referenced fight scenes involving female characters in Alien (1979) and the Terminator franchise, and wanted the film's fights to resemble "real fights" rather than wrestling matches. Early reports suggested that Rob Hardy would be the film's cinematographer, but he left the production before filming began. Gabriel Beristain served as cinematographer instead, having previously done so for the Marvel One-Shot short films Item 47 (2012) and Agent Carter (2013) as well as the television series Agent Carter. Beristain was initially not credited in the film's trailers as pointed out by Jeff Sneider of Collider, who wondered if contractual obstacles were to blame for Marvel not crediting the cinematographer at that point. Sneider felt Beristain would be credited in marketing materials leading up to the film's release, and he was confirmed in the role in the film's press advance. Beristein later confirmed he came as production had already began and moved to London, opting to leave a television directing job so he could be the main cinematographer in a Marvel Cinematic Universe film for the first time, having contributed additional photography for Iron Man and six other films. Shortland preferred to "be separate to the technical equipment" and also prioritize natural lighting, which provided a challenge in having to match the light of the location shoots in the additional photography filmed in Los Angeles. The naturalistic approach was also reflected in preferring lighting from outside, or lights with strong diffusion in interior scenes for the same effect. An anamorphic format was chosen to highlight the expansive movements and landscapes, "characters transitioning from the background to the foreground, crossing the screen in an elegant, majestic way", and filming those was helped by using an extension system that split the camera's image sensor from its body.

The production moved to Pinewood Studios in London in early June, with Ray Winstone joining the cast later that month. Shooting took place in mid-July at Hankley Common in Surrey, England, under the working title Blue Bayou. The site was made to look like a Russian farmstead, with added helicopter crash sites. The Thursley Parish Council objected to this filming, as it had occurred while Marvel Studios' application to use the site was still pending. The production planned to revisit the site in late August 2019 for further filming. Black Widow was officially announced at the 2019 San Diego Comic-Con later in July, with a release date of May 1, 2020, revealed alongside roles for some of the new cast members. In August, bodybuilder Olivier Richters announced that he had been cast in the film, and crew undertook scanning and textured photography at the Well-Safe Guardian oil rig in the North Sea as a reference for visual effects.

13 BMW X3s were used to create the car chase sequence involving Romanoff and Belova in Budapest, with the crew often switching off the electronic stability control and safety assistance functions to fit with the script, as well as swapping the X3's electronic parking brake for a hydraulically actuated one. Second unit director Darrin Prescott explained that the crew would often "replace the engine or tear the entire body off the car and rebuild it from scratch". The sequence's plot and locations were adjusted to help Prescott create the spontaneous, original stunts that he wanted.

A wrap party for the film was held at the end of September, before production moved to Macon, Georgia for the week of September 30. Filming locations in Macon, including Terminal Station, were dressed to portray Albany, New York. Set photos in October revealed that William Hurt would appear in the film, reprising his MCU role as Thaddeus Ross. Filming also took place in Atlanta, Budapest, Rome, Georgia, and Morocco. The production filmed for 87 days, and officially wrapped on October 6, 2019.

Post-production 

Matthew Schmidt and Leigh Folsom Boyd served as editors. A scene of Romanoff wearing underwear and a T-shirt that Shortland enjoyed due to "how sexy [Johansson] is [when] she's in control" was cut from the film because test audiences criticized the scene's "male gaze". In mid-March, Disney removed the film from its release schedule due to the COVID-19 pandemic. In early April, Disney announced that Black Widow would be released on November 6, 2020, and the rest of their Phase Four slate of films were shifted to accommodate this. In September 2020, Disney pushed the release back again to May 7, 2021, followed by a third shift in March 2021 to July 9, 2021.

In April 2021, following Julia Louis-Dreyfus's appearance as Valentina Allegra de Fontaine in the Marvel Studios television series The Falcon and the Winter Soldier (2021), Joanna Robinson of Vanity Fair reported that Louis-Dreyfus had been expected to first appear in Black Widow before its delays pushed the film's release to after the series' premiere on Disney+. Feige later confirmed this, with Black Widow post-credits scene originally intended to be the introduction to the character but now acting as a reference to her appearance in The Falcon and the Winter Soldier. He said this was the only change to Marvel's Phase Four plans that was forced by the pandemic. The post-credits scene was added after Hawkeye showrunner Jonathan Igla expressed interest in having Yelena Belova in his show, and Eric Pearson was asked to write it without knowing the character revealed as her target. Shortland said in May that the film had been completed a year prior and had not been altered despite the release delays. The release of the film revealed that Olga Kurylenko portrays Antonia Dreykov / Taskmaster in the film; Kurylenko's involvement was excluded from the film's marketing.

Visual effect vendors included Cinesite, Digital Domain, Industrial Light & Magic, Mammal Studios, SSVFX, Scanline VFX, Trixter, and Wētā FX. Digital Domain completed approximately 320 visual effects shots for the film, with work split between its offices in Los Angeles, Montreal and Vancouver, and was primarily responsible for the final battle sequence and creating the Red Room, an airborne fortress hidden in the clouds. The team took inspiration from architecture in the Soviet era, in addition to incorporating brutalist architecture, and had to plan major aspects of the sequence, such as the lighting, atmosphere, and the altitude. A combination of practical and visual effects were used to create the sequence. Actors and stunt performers were filmed in a wind tunnel against bluescreens while being held aloft using wires and mechanical arms. The surrounding environment was created entirely with computer graphics. Dave Hodgins, the Digital Domain VFX supervisor, said "Rendering one cloud is easy, but rendering 100 clouds – along with dozens of pieces of big and small debris – is very complex, to say the least." The visual effects team used GPU rendering to create the bulk of the wreckage and debris, which allowed them to do more in a shorter period of time. The falling debris was created from reference footage of other chunks of debris and additional premade assets, which allowed them to capture a "diorama of stuff falling in each shot". Larger pieces were tracked to more recognizable shapes, while a lot of pieces were inserted to make the scene look "aesthetically pleasing".

Industrial Light & Magic completed approximately 800 VFX shots for the film, and worked on the opening airplane escape scene, the Budapest apartment fight along with its subsequent motorcycle and car chase, and the Widows fighting Romanoff in Dreykov's room. The opening airplane escape scene was created with half of an airplane rig on a biscuit driving platform with hydraulics. To adjust the lighting of the scene, the footage filmed in Atlanta and the dirt path along the cornfield was taken to LED screens, while close-up shots of David Harbour's Shostakov hanging off the plane were captured onstage. Footage of practical cars were also filmed using a rig which launched them, while additional CGI cars were also inserted into the sequence. To create the Budapest scenes, ILM collaborated closely with the second unit director Darren Prescott. The combat scene in the kitchen was filmed using a wire rig, while both Johansson and Pugh performed their movements against the stunt doubles for the other sister to aid in the face replacements for stunt doubles in post. Their chase across the rooftops was also a combination of practical and visual effects. Scenes involving smokestacks were created using virtual actors, while the courtyard was a digitally recreated environment. The car chase scene in Budapest features a practical tank driven by Taskmaster created by Paul Corbould, the special effects supervisor. Digital cars were also added to the scene to make it appear more dangerous and for better interaction with the tank. While most components of the scene was filmed practically using stunt doubles, some parts, such as the scene where the door is ripped, was created digitally. For the fight scene in Dreykov's office, the team used a projector onset to adjust the lighting on the Widow's bodies. They had to change the position to fix the lighting, as the screens displayed graphics and to adjust to the choreography of the sequence.

Music 

Alexandre Desplat was revealed to be composing the music for the film in January 2020. Late in post-production, Lorne Balfe replaced Desplat as composer, which Desplat confirmed in May 2020. A cover of Nirvana's "Smells Like Teen Spirit" by Think Up Anger, featuring Malia J, is used in the opening credits sequence, and was suggested by Perception. "American Pie" by Don McLean and "Cheap Thrills" by Sia are also featured in the film. Balfe's score was released digitally by Marvel Music and Hollywood Records on July 9, 2021.

Marketing 
The film was officially announced at the 2019 San Diego Comic-Con, with Feige, Shortland, and cast members promoting it and introducing footage from the first 30 days of production. Some of that footage was included in a teaser trailer for the film released in December, with several commentators highlighting its spy thriller tone, and calling the film "long awaited" or "highly anticipated" by fans. Rachel Leishman of The Mary Sue said finally seeing a trailer for the film was "surprisingly emotional", and felt that setting it between Civil War and Infinity War would allow the character to grow into her more mature form from the latter film after earlier MCU films had depicted her in a supporting role to the male Avengers. Scott Mendelson of Forbes compared the trailer's story and tone to the films Atomic Blonde (2017), Red Sparrow (2018), and Anna (2019), but felt Black Widow had a commercial advantage over those films since it stars a familiar character. Mendelson thought this familiarity could outweigh the teaser's focus on "family melodrama" over superheroics, which he compared to Marvel's Thor (2011). The Hollywood Reporters Richard Newby found noticeable differences between Shortland's shot composition and cinematography in the trailer compared to the styles of Jon Favreau, Joss Whedon, and the Russo brothers, all directors who helped define Black Widow in previous MCU films. What was intended to be the final trailer for the film debuted in March 2020. Nicole Carpenter of Polygon said it was the most in-depth look at the film yet, with Josh Weiss of Syfy Wire enjoying its quieter moments in addition to the expected action sequences. Mendelson found the trailer to be an improvement over the teaser, attributing this to its theme of "found families (the Avengers), forced families ([the other characters in the trailer]) and actual family" portrayed by Pugh, Harbour, and Weisz.

Disney's president of marketing Asad Ayaz said that after Black Widow was delayed from its original May 2020 release date, the marketing team paused their campaign for the film. Once they began working towards a new release date in 2021, they were able to use character looks and story points that they had not revealed in the initial campaign to build a new approach to the film. Ayaz explained that they did not want it to feel like they had returned to the same marketing campaign, which focused on the Black Widow symbol and her black costume. The marketing team differentiated the new campaign by featuring the character's white costume from the film instead, and by focusing on her legacy as an Avenger. The campaign featured 30 brands, including co-branded opportunities with GEICO, Ziploc, BMW, and Synchrony Bank. Additional custom partnerships occurred with Fandango, YouTube, Roku, TikTok, Amazon, a Twitter E3 gaming sponsorship, and announcements, posters, and collectibles for the various premium theater experiences such as IMAX.

In September 2020, Barbie released two Black Widow dolls featuring the black and white outfits worn by Romanoff in the film. Marvel released another trailer for the film in April 2021, which Austen Goslin at Polygon felt was a new "final" trailer for the film's new release date. He said it only had a few new scenes in it but provided the best look yet at Taskmaster. Goslin highlighted the Russian-inspired version of The Avengers theme music used at the end of the trailer. Germain Lussier of io9 also highlighted the use of The Avengers theme, feeling that the music combined with footage from previous MCU films as well as flashback moments of Natasha and her family made the trailer feel more epic than the previous final trailer. Lussier said it was a trailer that "gets you excited for the return" of MCU films. Ethan Anderton of /Film said the "epic" free-falling fight with Taskmaster showcased in the trailer "looks like a sequence unlike any other" in the MCU. The trailer received over  views in its first 24 hours. On July 5, Moneymaker: Behind the Black Widow, a half-hour documentary special centered on Johansson's stunt double Heidi Moneymaker, premiered on ESPN+ as part of ESPN's E60 series. The special was directed by Martin Khodabakhshian and narrated by Johansson. A subsequent, eight-minute version of the special aired on ESPN's Outside the Lines on July 10. An episode of the series Marvel Studios: Legends was released on July 7, exploring Black Widow using footage from her previous MCU appearances.

Release

Theatrical and Premier Access 

Black Widow premiered on June 29, 2021, at various red carpet fan events in London, Los Angeles, Melbourne, and New York City. It premiered in 46 territories over the course of its first weekend. In the U.S. it opened in 4,100 theaters, with 375 in IMAX, over 800 in premium large format, 1,500 in 3D, and 275 in specialty D-Box, 4DX, and ScreenX theaters. In IMAX screenings, approximately 22 minutes of the film appeared in IMAX's expanded aspect ratio. Black Widow is the first film released in Phase Four of the MCU. Release dates for China, Taiwan, India, parts of Australia, and other Southeast Asia and Latin America markets were not set by the film's opening weekend, and by mid-September 2021, the film was not expected to be released theatrically in China.

The film was originally scheduled for release on May 1, 2020. In early March 2020, after the COVID-19 pandemic had caused the closure of theaters in many countries, the release date for the film No Time to Die was shifted from April 2020 to November 2020. Commentators began speculating about the potential for other major films like Black Widow to be postponed as well. Deadline Hollywood reported on rumors in the film distribution industry suggesting that Black Widow would take the November release date of Marvel's Eternals, with the latter being delayed until 2021, but Disney said that it still intended to release Black Widow in May 2020. After a trailer was released for the film a week later, Scott Mendelson at Forbes highlighted how the trailer's existence and use of the May 2020 release date confirmed that the film was not being delayed. He said this was "the logical choice at this juncture", feeling it was the ideal release date for the film and there was no evidence that the pandemic would affect its performance in the U.S. A week later, theaters across the U.S. were closed due to the pandemic and gatherings larger than 50 people were discouraged by the Centers for Disease Control and Prevention (CDC); Disney removed the film from its May release date. Adam B. Vary and Matt Donnelly at Variety questioned whether the MCU could be impacted more by the delay than other franchises due to its interconnected nature, though a Marvel Studios source told them that changing the film's release date would not affect the MCU timeline. The pair speculated that this was due to the film being a prequel set earlier in the timeline than other Phase Four films. In April, Disney changed its entire Phase Four release slate due to the pandemic, giving Eternals November 6, 2020, release date to Black Widow and shifting all of its other Phase Four films back in the release schedule to accommodate this.

Anthony D'Alessandro of Deadline Hollywood reported in September 2020 that Disney was considering rescheduling Black Widow again, with Variety also reporting this and attributing it to the low box office returns for Disney's Mulan in China and Warner Bros.' Tenet in North America. Later that month, Disney pushed back the release to May 7, 2021, rescheduling Eternals and Shang-Chi and the Legend of the Ten Rings (2021) as a result. In January 2021, Feige said he still expected Black Widow to debut in theaters, but Variety reported that Disney was considering releasing the film on its streaming service Disney+. There was also potential to delay the film's release again if the effects of the COVID-19 pandemic did not improve leading up to the planned May 2021 release, or to release the film concurrently in theaters and on Disney+ with Premier Access as was done with Disney's Raya and the Last Dragon (2021). Variety felt it would be "insurmountably more challenging" for Black Widow to become profitable if it did not have a traditional theatrical release. In early February, Disney CEO Bob Chapek reaffirmed that Black Widow was intended to be solely released in theaters, but Disney was cognizant of theaters reopening, particularly in large cities such as New York and Los Angeles, as well as consumer desire to return to theaters. According to Variety, Feige was opposed to a hybrid release for the film. If the film was delayed again, the film distribution industry believed Disney would move it to July 9, 2021, which at that point was the release date for Shang-Chi and the Legend of the Ten Rings. The next month, Chapek reiterated that Disney planned to release Black Widow in theaters on May 7, while Deadline Hollywood again noted that delaying the film, releasing it simultaneously on Disney+, or releasing it in theaters for a short time before making it available on Disney+ were all still possibilities. Chapek soon stated that Disney was remaining flexible as they gauged consumer behavior, and they would make a final decision on releasing the film at the "last minute".

In late March, Disney moved the film's release date to July 9, 2021, and announced that it would release simultaneously on Disney+ with Premier Access. Shang-Chi and the Legend of the Ten Rings was delayed again as a result. Kareem Daniel, the chairman of Disney Media and Entertainment Distribution, said the simultaneous release gave fans options to see the film while serving the "evolving preferences of audiences". Chaim Gartenberg at The Verge opined that Disney had to move forward with a simultaneous release for the film because they could not afford to delay Marvel's Phase Four television series. He explained that those series were some of the few "high-profile, must-watch shows" on Disney+, and once they began releasing with WandaVision in January 2021 there was only so much time that the films could be delayed before the interconnected nature of Marvel's storytelling began causing issues. For instance, the series Hawkeye was expected to release later in 2021 and contain spoilers for Black Widow, so the film needed to be released before then. Gartenberg described Disney and Marvel as being victims of their own success, but felt the potential revenue loss from the simultaneous release could lead to long-term positives such as fans who otherwise would not have watched Marvel's series potentially discovering them when signing up to Disney+ to watch Black Widow.

Lawsuit 
In July 2021, Johansson filed a lawsuit in Los Angeles County Superior Court against The Walt Disney Company, alleging that the simultaneous release of Black Widow on Disney+ breached a stipulation in her contract that the film be released exclusively in theaters. The suit stated that the simultaneous release exempted Disney from paying "very large box office bonuses" that Johansson would have reportedly been entitled to. According to The Wall Street Journal, Johansson had been concerned about the possibility of the film being released on Disney+ since prior to the release of Avengers: Endgame. Vulture contributor Chris Lee noted that not having any planned appearances in future MCU projects might have factored into Johansson's decision to file the lawsuit. Disney issued a statement in response, saying the suit had "no merit whatsoever" and calling it a "callous disregard for the horrific and prolonged global effects of the COVID-19 pandemic." Additionally, the company claimed that they had fully complied with Johansson's contract and that the Disney+ Premier Access release of the film had "significantly enhanced [Johansson's] ability to earn additional compensation on top of the $20M she has received to date."

Bryan Lourd, Johansson's agent and co-chairman of Creative Artists Agency (CAA), condemned Disney's response, stating that the company had "shamelessly and falsely accused Ms. Johansson of being insensitive to the global COVID pandemic" and accusing them of "leaving artistic and financial partners" out of their streaming profits, with CAA criticizing Disney's disclosure of Johansson's $20 million earnings as "an attempt to weaponize her success as an artist and businesswoman, as if that were something she should be ashamed of." The advocacy organizations Women in Film, ReFrame, and Time's Up also released a joint statement condemning Disney's response, calling it a "gendered character attack" and saying they "stand firmly against Disney's recent statement which attempts to characterize Johansson as insensitive or selfish for defending her contractual business rights". TheWrap reported that Johansson was shocked by the tone of Disney's response, while Disney chairman and former CEO Bob Iger was allegedly mortified by the lawsuit. Feige was reportedly angered and embarrassed by Disney's handling of the situation, and wanted the company to make it right with Johansson. SAG-AFTRA president Gabrielle Carteris condemned Disney's response as well, saying they "should be ashamed of themselves for resorting to tired tactics such as gender-shaming and bullying". In response to these criticisms, Disney attorney Daniel Petrocelli called the suit a "highly orchestrated [public relations] campaign to achieve an outcome that is not obtainable in a lawsuit".

Eriq Gardner at The Hollywood Reporter believed Johansson's case was potentially weak since disputes of this kind usually take place in arbitration, and that she had been forced into presenting a claim of tortious interference rather than a standard contract breach due to a clause in her contract. Gardner added that Johansson's complaint of Disney not waiting a few months for the market to recover from the impact of the pandemic was countered by the fact that Disney had already delayed the film's release by a year, since Disney would not want to wait too long after Avengers: Endgame to release Black Widow when the MCU was already moving on. This was especially true since the film introduces important new characters to the franchise such as Yelena Belova. Screen Daily editor Matt Mueller told BBC News that he expected the case would be resolved between Disney and Johansson before reaching court, and expressed surprise that Disney had let it get to this stage, given Warner Bros. had made agreements with stars for simultaneous releases in theaters and on HBO Max for titles like Space Jam: A New Legacy (2021). Mueller also believed the case would prompt other Hollywood film studios with streaming services to look at what "contractual steps" they would need to prevent further legal action like this. Variety reported in July 2021 that the case had prompted other Disney actors to consider similar litigations.

In August, Disney filed a motion to move the lawsuit to arbitration, citing that Black Widow had outgrossed other MCU films in its opening weekend with an "impressive pandemic-era showing". Johansson's attorney John Berlinski criticized this move as an attempt by Disney to "hide its misconduct in a confidential arbitration", while calling the company's initial response to the case misogynistic. The suit was settled a month later under undisclosed terms, though Deadline Hollywood reported that Johansson would receive over $40 million from Disney. The settlement came after Disney chose to give theatrical-only releases to subsequent 2021 films following the box office success of Shang-Chi and the Legend of the Ten Rings and Free Guy (2021), which both also received exclusive theatrical windows when initially released. In November 2021, Johansson said in regards to the lawsuit that she felt "very fortunate that nobody will have to go through what I went through" and thought the case had made "a positive impact in the industry and hopefully for artists and creatives' lives and livelihood."

Home media 
Black Widow was released in the U.S. on digital download by Walt Disney Studios Home Entertainment on August 10, 2021, and was released on Ultra HD Blu-ray, Blu-ray, and DVD on September 14. Deleted scenes, a gag reel, and various behind-the-scenes featurettes were included. The film was made available to all Disney+ subscribers for streaming starting October 6. The IMAX Enhanced version of the film was made available on Disney+ beginning on November 12.

Reception

Box office 
Black Widow grossed $183.7 million in the United States and Canada, and $196.1 million in other territories, for a worldwide total of $379.8 million. The film's opening weekend earned $226.2 million globally, which included $80.4 million domestic box office, $78.8 million international box office, and $67 million in Disney+ Premier Access global revenue. The opening weekend gross was within or exceeded various pre-release projections. In June 2021, Fandango reported that the film had the most ticket presales in 2021, and surpassed other MCU films like Doctor Strange (2016) and Spider-Man: Homecoming (2017).

Black Widow earned $39.5 million on its opening day, including $13.2 million from Thursday night previews, which was the best preview night and opening day since the onset of the COVID-19 pandemic in March 2020. Its total weekend gross was $80.4 million, making it the top film of the weekend. This was the largest box office opening since the COVID-19 pandemic began, surpassing F9s opening ($70 million), and the largest opening weekend since Star Wars: The Rise of Skywalker (2019). The domestic gross was within some of the pre-release projections for the film, though was considered under some industry projections made during the weekend after examining its opening night and preview grosses; Deadline Hollywood attributed some of this to the film's availability on Disney+ with Premier Access. When the $80.4 million theatrical gross was combined with the domestic Premier Access revenue of $55 million, totaling over $135.4 million for its opening weekend, Disney noted Black Widow was the only film to surpass $100 million in domestic consumer spend on opening weekend since the start of the pandemic, and marked the third largest opening ever for an MCU origin film, behind Black Panther ($202 million) and Captain Marvel ($153.4 million). Following its opening weekend, Black Widow posted the largest non-holiday Monday ($7.16 million) and Tuesday ($7.6 million) gross in the pandemic. The film passed $100 million in domestic box office six days after release, making it the fastest to do so in the pandemic.

In its second weekend, the film grossed $25.8 million, finishing second behind Space Jam: A New Legacy. Its 67% drop marked the largest sophomore week decline for an MCU film, passing Ant-Man and the Wasp (62%). Box office analysts attributed Black Widow second-week decline to its Disney+ Premier Access release, as well as widely reported piracies of the film online. In its third weekend, the film earned a further $11.6 million and became the fastest film to reach $150 million in total domestic box office gross in the pandemic. Black Widow was the fourth-highest-grossing film of 2021 in the United States and Canada.

Outside of North America, Black Widow earned $78.8 million in its opening weekend, from 46 markets. It was the number one film in nearly all of these markets, including the markets in the Asia Pacific region where it opened, excluding Japan, where it was third, and all markets in the Latin America region. Black Widow was the top pandemic opening weekend in 15 European markets. IMAX accounted for $4.8 million of the weekend gross, from 59 countries, 11 of which set opening weekend records for the pandemic. In South Korea, the film's opening day was the second-best of 2021, with $3.3 million, and Hong Kong had the best opening of the pandemic, with $3.2 million. The film had the largest opening day of the pandemic in Austria, the Czech Republic, Qatar, and Slovakia, while in Saudi Arabia, the film earned the highest opening day for a Disney release ever. It was the number one film on opening day in many other markets. , the top markets are South Korea ($26.3 million), the United Kingdom ($25.8 million), and France ($15.1 million).

Streaming viewership 
With Disney+ Premier Access, Black Widow earned $67 million worldwide in its opening weekend; it marked the first film Disney revealed Premier Access revenue for, with the revenue skewing heavily towards the United States with $55 million. Viewer tracking application Samba TV, which measures at least five minutes of viewership on smart televisions in over 3 million U.S. households, reported that 1.1 million households watched the film in its opening weekend. Deadline Hollywood noted that this viewership translated to about $33 million in revenue for Disney, considering the U.S.$29.99 price of Premier Access, which lined up with the announced worldwide revenue. The site also stated that Disney was receiving about 85% of the Disney+ Premier revenue, sharing the rest with platform providers such as Amazon Firestick and Apple TV+.

The following weekend, Deadline reported that Black Widow had become the most-pirated film of the past week, while some industry sources believed it had become the most-pirated film of the pandemic. Samba TV later updated the film's Disney+ Premier Access viewership, reporting that the film had been streamed over 2million times in the U.S. over its first 10 days of release, which resulted in around $60million in overall domestic revenue from Disney+. Samba TV also reported updates to 10-day viewership in the United Kingdom (258,000), Germany (116,000), and Australia (47,000). In October, Samba TV reported that over 1.1 million U.S. households had watched Black Widow in the first five days of its availability to all subscribers on Disney+. They also reported viewership in the United Kingdom (190,000) and Germany (96,000) during that same time frame. , Black Widow has earned $125 million through streaming and digital downloads. In its first 30 days, the film was watched in over 2.8million U.S. households. Deadline Hollywood also reported the film had been pirated over 20million times, resulting in at least $600million in lost revenue for Disney. In January 2022, tech firm Akami reported that Black Widow was the third-most pirated film of 2021.

Critical response 

The review aggregator Rotten Tomatoes reported an approval rating of 79%, with an average score of 6.9/10, based on 454 reviews. The website's critical consensus reads, "Black Widows deeper themes are drowned out in all the action, but it remains a solidly entertaining standalone adventure that's rounded out by a stellar supporting cast." On Metacritic, the film has a weighted average score of 67 out of 100, based on 57 critics, indicating "generally favorable reviews". Audiences polled by CinemaScore gave the film an average grade of "A−" on an A+ to F scale, while PostTrak reported 88% of audience members gave it a positive score, with 69% saying they would definitely recommend it.

Owen Gleiberman of Variety initially feared Black Widow would be two hours of Johansson being "a kick-ass fighter in sleek leather with a few signature jackknife moves" but instead found the film to be "much more interesting and absorbing" and "features just enough kinetic combat to give a mainstream audience that getting-your-money's-worth feeling, but from the opening credits, most of it has a gritty, deliberate, zap-free tone that is strikingly — and intentionally — earthbound for a superhero fantasy." Brian Tallerico of RogerEbert.com praised Pugh's performance as "finding just the right shades of strength and vulnerability" and as "the film's MVP".

Writing for The Hollywood Reporter, David Rooney called Black Widow a "high-octane espionage thriller" that "[shifts] away from the superhero template." Rooney added the film was "a stellar vehicle" for Johansson and praised the supporting cast. Joshua Rivera of Polygon wrote "Black Widow has a focus that's refreshing to the MCU, allowing it a sense of style and fun that's genuinely enjoyable once you get over the strangeness of the film's continuity in the MCU", although he said the film feels "hollow" and like an "apology" after the death of Romanoff in Avengers: Endgame. IndieWires Eric Kohn gave the film a B grade, writing, "Like the welcoming breeziness of Spider-Man: Homecoming, the saga of Natasha and Yelena doesn't try to rope in the fate of the known universe to make its operation worthwhile. The relatively low stakes help to foreground their moody dynamic, at least whenever the hand-to-hand combat doesn't get there first. Fortunately, the movie delivers on that front, most notably during a brawl between Black Widow and the robotic killer known as Taskmaster who mirrors her every move. If this is the last time we get to see Johansson mete out justice to her assailants with gymnastic velocity, it's an apt send-off."

Pete Hammond of Deadline Hollywood wrote that Johansson "goes out with all guns blazing as this first film in Phase 4 of the MCU does not stint one bit on the action," with a film that "more importantly focuses on the human being behind the shield of a superhero." Hammond felt that the opening sequence revealing Romanoff's family construct are actually Russian spies was reminiscent of The Americans, while he praised the chemistry between Johansson and Pugh, "with Natasha's awkward shyness counterpunched by the lively and cynical Yelena." Of the performances, Hammond said: "Johansson is again a great presence in the role, showing expert action and acting chops throughout, while Pugh is clearly ready to lead her own franchise after this MCU debut. Weisz is simply such a good actor she can even make some of the more ridiculous dialogue land, and Harbour, tatted to the hilt, is clearly having a blast overplaying every moment of a character designed to think only about himself." Hammond also said "having Winstone in this picture lifts it several notches, and he is deliciously fun and scarily authentic as the villain of the piece."

Writing for BBC Culture, Caryn James gave the film four out of five stars, opining that the film was "the least Avenger-like movie in the [MCU] so far", and that "after all this time a tweak in the formula is a good thing." James, like Hammond, noted the film's opening sequence as reminiscent of The Americans, while she praised Pugh's performance, calling Belova "the most vibrant person in the film, more lived-in than most action-movie characters." James, however, also noted the film's presentation of "the perfect metaphor for Russia v the West" with "the Russians hav[ing] developed a synthetic formula that can suppress free will" with "nothing deep or heavy about the film's treatment of that idea". James also felt that Romanoff was "the least interesting character" amongst her family, being "an odd fit for the sly family movie unfolding around her", and felt the film had a "typically Avengers" ending with "an overwrought, too-long action scene that plays like a festival of stunt doubles tossing each other around a Russian lab."

Accolades 
Black Widow was one of 28 films that received the ReFrame Stamp for 2021, awarded by the gender equity coalition ReFrame for films that are proven to have gender-balanced hiring.

Documentary special 

In February 2021, the documentary series Marvel Studios: Assembled was announced. The specials go behind the scenes of the MCU films and television series with cast members and additional creatives. A special for Black Widow, featuring Johansson, released on Disney+ on October 20, 2021.

Future 
Pugh reprised her role in the Disney+ series Hawkeye, with her involvement in the series set up by the film's post-credits scene. In June 2021, Shortland expressed interest in directing another film in the MCU, and noted that a potential sequel to Black Widow would likely revolve around a different character since Romanoff is dead in the present-day MCU. Weisz stated that she would be interested in a future storyline featuring Vostokoff assuming her Iron Maiden comic book persona.

Notes

References

External links 

  at Marvel.com
 
 

2020s American films
2020s English-language films
2020s feminist films
2020s spy thriller films
2020s superhero films
2021 3D films
2021 action thriller films
2021 controversies in the United States
2021 science fiction action films
4DX films
American 3D films
American action thriller films
American science fiction action films
American science fiction thriller films
American spy action films
American spy thriller films
 
Disney controversies
Films about dysfunctional families
Films about mind control
Films about sisters
Films based on works by Stan Lee
Films directed by Cate Shortland
Films postponed due to the COVID-19 pandemic
Films scored by Lorne Balfe
Films set in 1995
Films set in 2016
Films set in Albany, New York
Films set in Budapest
Films set in Cuba
Films set in Morocco
Films set in Norway
Films set in Ohio
Films set in Russia
Films set in Saint Petersburg
Films shot at Pinewood Studios
Films shot in Atlanta
Films shot in Budapest
Films shot in Georgia (U.S. state)
Films shot in Morocco
Films shot in Norway
Films shot in Surrey
Films with Disney+ Premier Access
IMAX films
Interquel films
Marvel Cinematic Universe: Phase Four films
ScreenX films
Superhero crossover films
Superhero thriller films
Superheroine films
Works by Jac Schaeffer
Works by Scarlett Johansson
Works subject to a lawsuit